Soul Sister may refer to:

 Soul Sister (Shirley Scott album), 1966
Soul Sister (Aretha Franklin album), 1966
Soul Sisters, 1963 album by Gloria Coleman
Soulsister, a Belgian pop group
Soul Sister (book), a 1969 book by Grace Halsell, who darkened her skin and passed as a black woman
Soul Sister (musical), a 2012 musical stage show featuring the music of Ike and Tina Turner

See also 
Soul Sista, a 2001 album by Keke Wyatt
 "Soul Sista" (song), a 2000 song by Bilal